The Hen and the Sexton is a 1951 Czechoslovak comedy film directed by Oldřich Lipský and Jan Strejček.

Plot 
In the village of Luzanky in Moravian Slovakia live a "progressive" peasant, Toněk Puknica, and his "backward" wife, Tereza. Tonek is in favor of establishing an agricultural cooperative (kolkhoz), while Tereza is against it. The village is also home to a rich and greedy Voznick, who hates the collective farm movement. He wants to prevent the creation and successful work of the cooperative.

The members of the cooperative are working hard to increase their harvest, installing a new irrigation system and preparing the fields for plowing. Voznick convinces the local naive and greedy clerk, Koditek, to help him sabotage the farmers' efforts.

He begins to distribute leaflets, involving Tonek's son Vinko. At the end of the film, everything is revealed, Kodytik is convinced of the benefits of cooperatives, and even Tereza recognizes this. The village cheerfully celebrates the harvest festival.

Cast 

 Vlasta Burian as Josef Koditek, the sexton
 Otomar Korbelarz as Tonek Puknica, a "progressive" peasant
 Iryna Stepnychkova as Teresa, wife of Tonek Puknica
 Vladimir Repa as Charioteer, a peasant kulak
 Eduard Muron as Wink, son of Tonek Puknica
 Josef Beck as national security officer
 Iryna Bila
 Lubomir Lipski as Sarl, son of the Charioteer
 Josef Toman as Rerabek
 Bohumil Schwartz as Jarosz, son of Rerabek
 Otto Cermak as Wacław
 Frantisek Mirosław Doubrava as foreman
 Eman Fiala as Spacil
 Daria Hajska as Pawlena
 Josef Hlynomaz

External links
 
 Slepice a kostelník

1950 films
1950 comedy films
1950s Czech-language films
Films directed by Oldřich Lipský
Czechoslovak comedy films
Czech comedy films
Czechoslovak black-and-white films
1950s Czech films